Time Capsule, subtitled The First Five Years of Fingathing, is a compilation of Fingathing's first three albums. It was released by Grand Central Records in September 2005. The American edition of the album And the Big Red Nebula Band also has a bonus album called Time Capsule but only has five tracks.

Track listing
 "Head to Head"  – 4:10
 "Wasting Time"  – 5:54
 "Drunken Master"  – 4:19
 "Slippin'" (featuring Veba)  – 5:18
 "Music to Watch Aliens By"  – 2:50
 "Ffathead"  – 3:20
 "Big Monsters Crush Cities"  – 6:00
 "Superhero Music"  – 5:52
 "Synergy"  – 5:32
 "Slop"  – 3:51
 "Don't Turn Around"  – 5:53
 "You Fly Me"  – 3:11
 "Walk in Space"  – 5:02

References

Fingathing albums
2005 compilation albums
Grand Central Records compilation albums